Les Burgraves is a historical play by Victor Hugo, first performed by the Comédie-Française on 7 March 1843. It takes place along the Rhine and features the return of Emperor Barbarossa. The play failed commercially and was the last of Hugo's plays to be produced in his lifetime. It was the subject of an orchestral overture by the composer Guillaume Lekeu in 1890.

The play is associated thematically with Hugo's Le Rhin, an essayistic book about the Rhine; both were inspired by a trip along the river Hugo took with Juliette Drouet. Les Burgraves was published with a preface indicating that its depiction of a united Germany was part of a larger vision of a united Europe in which France would play a central role.

References

External links
 

1843 plays
Plays by Victor Hugo
Plays set in the 12th century
Plays set in Germany
Cultural depictions of Frederick I, Holy Roman Emperor